Dorcadion peksi is a species of beetle in the family Cerambycidae. It was described by Bernhauer in 2010.

References

peksi
Beetles described in 2010